Zhang Yu (born 12 February 1986 in Chaoyang, Liaoning) is a female Chinese basketball player who was part of the team that won the gold medal at the 2005–2006 WCBA. She competed at the 2008 Summer Olympics in Beijing. She is the twin sister of Zhang Wei. In 2013, she played for the Shanxi Xing Rui Flame, and won another WCBA title.

References

1986 births
Living people
Basketball players at the 2008 Summer Olympics
Olympic basketball players of China
People from Chaoyang, Liaoning
Basketball players from Liaoning
Chinese women's basketball players
Shanxi Flame players
Chinese twins
Liaoning Flying Eagles players
Beijing Great Wall players